The 2022 Open Araba en Femenino was a professional tennis tournament played on outdoor hard courts. It was the third edition of the tournament which was part of the 2022 ITF Women's World Tennis Tour. It took place in Vitoria-Gasteiz, Spain between 18 and 24 July 2022.

Champions

Singles

  Jessika Ponchet def.  Jenny Dürst, 6–4, 7–5

Doubles

  Maria Bondarenko /  Ioana Loredana Roșca def.  Isabelle Haverlag /  Justina Mikulskytė, 4–6, 6–4, [11–9]

Singles main draw entrants

Seeds

 1 Rankings are as of 11 July 2022.

Other entrants
The following players received wildcards into the singles main draw:
  Lucía Cortez Llorca
  Carolina Gómez
  Berta Gutiérrez Saiz
  Claudia Hoste Ferrer

The following players received entry from the qualifying draw:
  Flavie Brugnone
  Celia Cerviño Ruiz
  Jenny Dürst
  Ku Yeon-woo
  Verena Meliss
  Sofia Milatová
  Adrienn Nagy
  Laetitia Pulchartová

References

External links
 2022 Open Araba en Femenino at ITFtennis.com
 Official website

2022 ITF Women's World Tennis Tour
2022 in Spanish tennis
July 2022 sports events in Spain